Richard "Rich" Moffatt (born c. 1959)  is a Canadian curler from Ottawa, Ontario. In 1999, he became only the third curler to skip an Ottawa-area team at the Brier.

Moffatt skipped his own team for much of his career. In 1999, he won the Ontario Men's Curling Championship, qualifying him for the 1999 Labatt Brier. At the Brier, his rink from the Rideau Curling Club finished with a 6-5 record.

Moffatt retired from curling in 2007, but quickly changed his mind and came back to play for Bryan Cochrane. He played with Cochrane until 2012. Moffatt joined up with Howard Rajala (as his third) to win the 2013 Ontario Senior curling championships.

Personal life
Moffatt attended Carleton University for political science.

References

External links
 

Curlers from Ottawa
Living people
Year of birth missing (living people)
Canadian male curlers
Carleton University alumni